is a Japanese footballer who plays for Gainare Tottori.

Club statistics
Updated to 23 February 2017.

References

External links

Profile at Mito HollyHock

1990 births
Living people
University of Tsukuba alumni
Association football people from Shizuoka Prefecture
Japanese footballers
J2 League players
J3 League players
Mito HollyHock players
Gainare Tottori players
Association football defenders